Brandon Terry Thomson (born 7 March 1995) is a South African rugby union player, currently playing with Scottish Pro14 side Glasgow Warriors. His regular position is fly-half.

Rugby union career

Youth: Pumas and South African Schools

He was the joint-sixth top scorer at the 2012 event in Port Elizabeth with 25 points, and the seventh-highest points scorer in the 2013 event in Polokwane with 40 points. After the 2013 tournament, Thomson was also included in a South African Schools side for their annual Under-18 International Series against sides from Europe. He started their match against England and kicked two penalties in a 19–14 victory. He was an unused replacement for their second match against France, but returned to the starting line-up for their final match against Wales, kicking two conversions in a 14–13 victory.

Youth: Western Province, Maties and South Africa Under-20

After finishing high school, Thomson moved to the Western Cape to join the Western Province Rugby Institute prior to the 2014 season. He represented the  side during the 2014 Under-19 Provincial Championship, making eight appearances and scoring nine points as the team finished in third position on the log to qualify for the play-offs. He didn't feature in the play-offs, however, where Western Province beat  29–22 in the semi-finals and the s 33–26 in the final to win the competition. Thomson also made one appearance for the s in the 2014 Under-21 Provincial Championship, coming on as a replacement in their match against the s.

At the start of 2015, Thomson was included in the  squad that played in the 2015 Varsity Cup. He played in all seven of their matches during the competition – scoring 24 points in the process – in a disappointing season for Maties, who missed out on the semi-finals by finishing the season in fifth position.

Shortly after the Varsity Cup, he was selected a 37-man South Africa Under-20 training squad and also started for them in a friendly match, kicking two penalties and a conversion in a 31–24 victory in a friendly match against a Varsity Cup Dream Team at the conclusion of the 2015 Varsity Cup competition. He was named in their squad to tour Argentina for a two-match series as preparation for the 2015 World Rugby Under 20 Championship. He was an unused replacement in their 25–22 victory over Argentina in the first match, but started in their 39–28 win in the second match four days later, scoring two penalties and four conversions for the visitors.

Upon the team's return, he was named in the final squad for the 2015 World Rugby Under 20 Championship. He started all three of their matches in Pool B of the competition and was also the main kicker for South Africa throughout the competition. He kicked three conversions in a 33–5 win against hosts Italy in the opening match, three penalties and two conversions in a 40–8 win against Samoa and two penalties and four conversions in their final match against Australia, also scoring a try in the 55th minute of their 46–13 win. The results meant that South Africa finished top of Pool B to qualify for the semi-finals with the best record in the pool stage of all the teams in the competition. Thomson also started their semi-final match against England, kicking two conversions and two penalties, but couldn't prevent them losing the match 20–28 to be eliminated from the competition by England for the second year in succession. He started their third-place play-off match against France, with his four conversions and one penalty helping South Africa to a 31–18 win to win the bronze medal. He ended the competition as the top scorer in the tournament, with 59 points.

Thomson returned to domestic action in July 2015 to play for the  side in the 2015 Under-21 Provincial Championship Group A. He started six of his side's twelve matches during the regular season of the competition, helping them finish top of the log after winning ten of their matches.

In 2016, Thomson was named as a member of Super Rugby team the ' training squad that prepared for the 2016 Super Rugby season.

Glasgow Warriors

In February 2017, Thomson joined Scottish Pro12 club Glasgow Warriors on a two-month loan deal. He made his Pro 12 debut at fullback in their Round 15 match against Ulster, scoring a try and one conversion in a 17–37 defeat. He has the Warrior No. 280. He started their next match against Ospreys at fly-half, scoring five points with the boot, and came on as a replacement in a 47–17 win over Newport Gwent Dragons.

Thomson also featured for Stirling County in the Scottish Premiership.

On 4 July 2017 it was announced that Thomson would return to the Warriors, after his successful loan period at the end of the 2016-17 season. The fly-half secured a permanent two-year deal starting for the 2017–18 season.

Thomson was drafted to Ayr in the Scottish Premiership for the 2017–18 season.

Thomson has been drafted to Stirling County in the Scottish Premiership for the 2018–19 season.

Stirling County

Stirling County ran a professional side, as well as an amateur side in 2019-20. This was in the Super 6 league competition, a new professional league run by the SRU. Players could turn out for the Super 6 sides as well as the provincial sides Glasgow Warriors and Edinburgh Rugby. Thomson played for the professional Stirling County side.

Cheetahs

On 8 February 2021 Thomson signed a deal with the Cheetahs through to 2022.

References

South African rugby union players
Living people
1995 births
People from Govan Mbeki Local Municipality
Rugby union fly-halves
Western Province (rugby union) players
South Africa Under-20 international rugby union players
Glasgow Warriors players
Stirling County RFC players
Ayr RFC players
Stormers players
Free State Cheetahs players
Cheetahs (rugby union) players
Rugby union players from Mpumalanga
Pumas (Currie Cup) players